Rodolphe Francois Ghislain de Lorraine de Landas Berghes St. Winock (November 1, 1873 – November 17, 1920), better known as Rudolph de Landas Berghes, was Regionary Bishop of Scotland of the Old Roman Catholic Western Orthodox Church and later Archbishop of the Old Roman Catholic Church of America.

In Europe
Berghes was born in Naples, Kingdom of Italy, the "son of Count de Landas Bourgogne de Rache and Adelaide M. de Gramont-Hamilton, and belonged to the noble family of De Berghes-Saint-Winoc."
He "lived most of his life in England."
"He claimed to have succeeded in 1907, to prince dukedom, of de Berghes, on letters approved by" King Leopold II of Belgium and Emperor Franz Joseph I of Austria, according to his obituary in the Philadelphia Evening Public Ledger. But his name was not found in Almanach de Gotha which began to list "Berghes-Saint-Winock" as an "extinct house" in 1908. 

Frederick Cunliffe-Owen, a "chronicler of nobility", "in one of his newspaper articles, said that if" Berghes' name "was his right one he was a prince; but he could not be a prince, because the line of succession to the title passed in 1907."
He said he was raised as a Protestant and educated at Eton College and the universities of Cambridge, Paris and Brussels. He completed courses in law, theology and military tactics.

At Cambridge, he reportedly became a supporter of the high church and became interested in Anglo-Catholicism. To avert this, his mother reportedly made him transfer to the Faculty of Protestant Theology at the University of Paris.

According to The New York Times, he "described himself as" an "ex-staff officer of the British Army, with the rank of Captain."
According to his obituary, he "declared in statements after his arrival at Villanova that he had seen service under" Herbert Kitchener, 1st Earl Kitchener, both in Sudan and in Egypt.
Cunliffe-Owen asserted that Berghes also claimed service under Kitchener in the Second Boer War. 

Berghes claimed, according to his obituary, that he attained "the rank of lieutenant colonel before leaving the army".
Cunliffe-Owen "asserted that if" Berghes "was in the British Army he must have been under some other name," because the "army lists," Cunliffe-Owen "alleged, do not contain a name similar to his."

He said that later, he joined the Church of England and received orders there but the question of the validity of his orders bothered him.
It was for this reason that he joined the Old Catholic Church.
He joined the Old Catholic Church in 1910.

Mathew ordained Berghes in a private oratory in November, 1912, in Bedford Park, London, and consecrated him in June, 1913, as Mathew's regionary bishop of Scotland. When, according to Anson, "they issued a formal statement that [...] Mathew had ceased to be an Old Catholic on December 29, 1910, and that after that date they recognized none of his episcopal actions."

He was, according to Anson, "an Austro-Hungarian subject" who was liable to capture and internment "as an enemy alien" for the duration of the war, so "with the connivance of the Foreign Office" Berghes left, and arrived in the United States on November 16, 1914. .

In the United States

He is listed on passenger lists as having left from Liverpool on the S.S. New York on November 7, 1914. He arrived on November 16, 1914. Cunliffe-Owen incorrectly stated he arrived in 1912, while Anson cited 1914. 

At the invitation of Protestant Episcopal Church of the United States (PECUSA) bishop David H. Greer of the Episcopal Diocese of New York, but without Mathew's authorization, Berghes participated in the consecration of Hiram Richard Hulse as the  Missionary Bishop of Cuba on January 12, 1915. 
It was reported on a society page a few days later that Berghes "is to be assigned as rector" of a  parish in New York City and that Greer "announce[d] that the appointment will be made."

After Hulse's consecration, newspapers questioned Berghes' true identity and so did  bishops. Allegations about his background were printed in newspapers.  Bishop Philip M. Rhinelander, of the Episcopal Diocese of Pennsylvania, requested more information from Cunliffe-Owen about Berghes. Cunliffe-Owen wrote to Rhinelander that after Cunliffe-Owen had warned William T. Manning who warned Greer, Berghes "found Brooklyn and New York too hot for him and vanished." In 1915 Berghes filed a lawsuit against Cunliffe-Owen, an editor of the New-York Tribune, for libel. Berghes alleged in the complaint that Cunliffe-Owen' statements, "as to the genuineness of the temporal and ecclesiastical titles" that he used, "have caused him to be rejected" in  circles, "although", 
Berghes complained "that the article spoke sarcastically of him and intimated that he was masquerading under a pseudonym." Cunliffe-Owen compared Berghes to another bishop "who fell into disrepute because of irregular practices in London", Andrew Charles McLaglen; Berghes correctly stated that Cunliffe-Owen had mistaken him for McLaglen. Cunliffe-Owen "wrote that if" Berghes was McLaglen then "he had been exposed several times" in London newspapers for "religious and philanthropic swindles."
But according to The New York Times, Cunliffe-Owen "did not say that" Berghes and "McLagen were the same. He merely, in his article and later in a private letter, showed points of similarity between the two."

Berghes "made the [...] claim of elevation to archbishop and metropolitan in 1916."
He began calling himself the Archbishop of the Old Roman Catholic Church of America.
He moved to St. Dunstan's Abbey in Waukegan, Illinois, and consecrated William Henry Francis, the abbot, and Carmel Henry Carfora as bishops on consecutive days in October, 1916.
Carfora was his auxiliary bishop.

He consecrated Stanislaus Mickiewicz in 1917. William Wolkovich-Valkavicius called Mickiewicz, in Polish American Studies, a "major figure in the Lithuanian separatist movement." Mickiewicz, a Lithuanian, emigrated from the Russian Empire, worked in a Chicago, Illinois, "meat market for a short time." After he failed at three seminaries, Mickiewicz "turned to" Stephen Kaminski who ordained him in 1907. Mickiewicz, "apparently with no commitment to Kaminski," according to Wolkovich-Valkavicius, "became a free-lance priest" in New England. 
He was involved along with Bishop Franciszek Hodur of the Polish National Catholic Church (PNCC) in a schism dividing the St Joseph's Lithuanian Catholic congregation of the Roman Catholic Diocese of Scranton where a dissident group gained possession of the church. A lawsuit was filed demanding the restitution of the church. Mickiewicz was pastor of the independent Lithuanian parish in Scranton, Pennsylvania started by the dissidents. However, "because of his unsavory conduct," Mickiewicz "was charged with breach of discipline and left of his own accord rather than face expulsion." "Unimpeded," Mickiewicz "sped off to Lawrence, Massachusetts, drawn by" another parish conflict in a Lithuanian community with a "high proportion of socialists and freethinkers." "There he declared himself the 'Messenger of God', and Administrator of all independent Lithuanian parishes. By July 1916 he established a separatist church." "To upgrade his status," Mickiewicz "summoned a lay synod in June 1917, and arranged to be elected bishop by popular acclaim." De Landas Berghas then consecrated him as a bishop. Mickiewicz "then persuaded" de Landas Berghas, according to Wolkovich-Valkavicius, "to set up a mini-seminary in Lawrence, teaching and ordaining a half dozen Lithuanians." Mickiewicz "fell quickly," according to Wolkovich-Valkavicius. "His continued misconduct brought public censure from his people. [...] Intimations of 'heresy, impurity, drunkenness and falsehood' led" de Landas Berghas, "as Metropolitan of the Old Roman Catholic Church of America, to banish" Mickiewicz in 1918, "stripping him perpetually of orders and jurisdiction, according to the" Lawrence The Evening Tribune "account. The decree of December 3 was also signed by the regionary bishop, [...] Carfora at New York City. Several sources credit" Mickiewicz's "successor, [Stasys] Sleinis, with having a hand in the expulsion." Mickiewicz moved from Lawrence to Chicago where he failed to "compete with" a Lithuanian parish in the Roman Catholic Archdiocese of Chicago. He later joined Francis who Berghes also consecrated.
 
Smit wrote that after World War I, the  "distanced itself more from the  Mathew and those ordained and consecrated by him."

Bishop William Montgomery Brown, of the Episcopal Diocese of Arkansas, a Modernist and Communist later "known as the 'atheist bishop'," presented "the correspondence and request of " to the October 1919 General Convention of the Episcopal Church in the United States of America which referred the documents to a special committee consisting of the bishops who "confer with officials of the Eastern Orthodox Churches and the Old Catholics". The committee reported that they considered what was presented but were "not prepared to recommend any action". They reported, "the reception of a person applying to minister in" the  "belongs to the jurisdiction of the several Bishops of the same." So, the General Convention discharged the committee "from the further consideration of the subject." Brown resigned later that year.

Mathew died on December 19, 1919.

On November 22, 1919, he abandoned Old Catholicism and took a solemn vow of abjuration at the hands of Patrick Joseph Hayes, Archbishop of New York, in St. Patrick's Cathedral, New York.
He converted to the Catholic Church, "renounced his titles", and entered the Augustinian St. Thomas Monastery in Villanova, Pennsylvania as a novice where he "died during his probation," several months later on November 17, 1920. He was buried in the monastery's cemetery.

He made "the claim," according to his obituary, "that through his efforts the American branch of the Old Catholics number[ed] in 1920 about 120,000 in Canada and the United States."

After Mathew died in 1919, the  declared in 1920 that Mathew's "consecration was obtained  and that consequently it is null and void."

Name and title variations
Berghes was known by a variety of names and titles throughout his life and after.

In 1915, his "full name and title" was reported as "the Rt. Rev. Bishop Prince de Landas Berghes et de Rache" in The Washington Post.
In 1915, his full name was reported as "Rodolphe Francois Ghislain de Lorraine de Landas Berghes St. Winock", the name he gave in a 1915 legal complaint, according to The New York Times, New-York Tribune, and The Sun.
In 1915, that he "shortened his name to Bishop de Landas Berghes" according to The Sun.
In 1915, his "name in holy orders" was reported as "Bishop de Landas Berghes, Regionary Bishop of Scotland of the Old Roman Catholic Western Orthodox Church" in the New-York Tribune.
In 1915 and 1916, his name and title were reported as "Rodolphe Francois Ghislain de Lorraine de Landas Berghes St. Winock, who described himself as Regionary Bishop of Scotland of the Old Roman Catholic Western Orthodox Church" in The New York Times, and reported as "Rodolphe Francois Ghislain de Lorraine de Landas Berghes St. Winock, who in holy orders is known as Regionary Bishop of Scotland of the old Roman Catholic Western Orthodox Church" in the New-York Tribune.
In 1916, he called himself "" in Carfora's instrument of consecration.
In 1919, the  called him "" in its General Convention journal.
In 1920, the Philadelphia Evening Public Ledger reported that his "full name was the Most Reverend Prince and Duke de Landas Berghes St. Winock et de Rache, Rodolph Francois St. Patrice Alphonsus Ghislain de Gramont-Hamilton de Lorraine" in his obituary. The obituary was syndicated the next day in the New-York Tribune.
In 1920, the Philadelphia Evening Public Ledger reported that he "prefer[ed] to be designated simply as Dr. Berghes".
In 1920,  reported that his ""

In 1947, Brandreth called him "Prince de Landas Berghes et de Rache" in Episcopi Vagantes and the Anglican Church.
In 1964, Anson called him "Rudolph Francis Edward St Patrick Alphonsus Ghislain de Gramont Hamilton de Lorraine-Brabant, Prince de Landas Berghes et de Rache, Duc de St Winock" in Bishops at Large.

Notes

References

Austrian nobility
Presiding Archbishops of the North American Old Catholic Church
Converts from Anglicanism
American Roman Catholics
Converts to Roman Catholicism from Catholic Independent denominations
1873 births
1920 deaths
People educated at Eton College